Cheikh Cory Sene (born 20 April 2001) is a Senegalese professional footballer who plays as a centre-back for Lens B.

Professional career
Sene made his professional debut in a 2–1 Ligue 2 win over Le Mans on 27 July 2019.

On 12 January 2021, Sene was loaned to French side Annecy FC, until the end of the season.

References

External links
 
 
 RC Lens Profile

2001 births
Living people
Association football defenders
Senegalese footballers
Ligue 2 players
Championnat National players
Championnat National 2 players
RC Lens players
FC Annecy players
Senegalese expatriate footballers
Senegalese expatriate sportspeople in France
Expatriate footballers in France